In computer science, an e-graph is a data structure that stores an equivalence relation over terms of some language.

Definition and operations

Let  be a set of function symbols, let  be the subset of  consisting of symbols of arity . Let  be a countable set of opaque identifiers that may be compared for equality, called e-class IDs. Then an e-node is an -ary function symbol together with  e-class IDs. An e-node with -ary function symbol  and e-class IDs  is denoted  . An e-class is a set of e-nodes.

An e-class ID  is canonical if . An e-node  (with ) is canonical if each  is canonical ( in ).

An e-graph is the combination of:

 the union-find structure , 
 a hashcons  (i.e. a mapping) from canonical e-nodes to e-class IDs, and 
 an e-class map  that maps e-class IDs to e-classes, such that  maps equivalent IDs to the same set of e-nodes:

Invariants

In addition to the above structure, a valid e-graph conforms to several data structure invariants. Two e-nodes are equivalent if they are in the same e-class. The congruence invariant states that an e-graph must ensure that equivalence is closed under congruence, where two e-nodes  are congruent when . The hashcons invariant states that the hashcons maps canonical e-nodes to their e-class ID.

Operations

The last operation, e-matching, is described below.

E-matching

Let  be a set of variables and let  be the smallest set that includes the 0-arity function symbols (also called constants), includes the variables, and is closed under application of the function symbols. A term containing variables is called a pattern, a term without variables is called ground.

An e-graph  represents a ground term  if one of its e-classes represents . An e-class  represents  if some e-node  does. An e-node  represents a term  if  and each e-class  represents the term  ( in ).

There are several known algorithms for e-matching, the relational e-matching algorithm is based on worst-case optimal joins and is worst-case optimal.

Equality saturation

Equality saturation is a technique for building optimizing compilers using e-graphs. It operates by applying a set of rewrites using e-matching until the e-graph is saturated, a timeout is reached, an e-graph size limit is reached, a fixed number of iterations is exceeded, or some other halting condition is reached. After rewriting, an optimal term is extracted from the e-graph according to some cost function, usually related to AST size or performance considerations.

Applications

E-graphs are used in automated theorem proving. They are a crucial part of modern SMT solvers such as Z3 and CVC4. They are also used in the Simplify theorem prover of ESC/Java.

Equality saturation is used in specialized optimizing compilers, e.g. for deep learning and linear algebra. Equality saturation has also been used for translation validation applied to the LLVM toolchain.

E-graphs have been applied to several problems in program analysis, including fuzzing, abstract interpretation, and library learning.

References

External links
 The Egg Project
 A Colab notebook explaining e-graphs

Graph data structures